Cecilia García-Peñalosa is a Spanish economist and a research fellow at the Aix-Marseille University. She is also a research professor at the Institute for Fiscal Studies and has an affiliation with the Bank of France.  She was an associate editor of the European Economic Review and is currently an associate editor at the Journal of Economic Inequality.

She is a researcher at the School for Advanced Studies in the Social Sciences (EHESS) in France. From 2012 to 2016, she was a member of the Council of Economics Advisors who advises the Prime Minister of France. In 2009, she won the Aldi Hagenaars Memorial Award.

Education and career 
She obtained her D.Phil from Nuffield College, Oxford after a master's degree at Corpus Christi College, Oxford. She holds a bachelor in Economics from the University of Cambridge. She held visiting positions at the Free University of Amsterdam, European University Institute in Florence, University of Washington, University of Geneva and Ludwig Maximilian University of Munich.

Research 
Her research focuses on economic growth, income inequality and gender inequality. She has published paper in the American Economic Review, The Journal of Development Economics and The Journal of Public Economics.

Her research has been quoted in Le Figaro, The Economist, Le Monde, France Soir, Les Echos, TV5 Monde,  France Culture, Le Monde Diplomatique, Le Point, La Tribune, and the Huffington Post.

She is an expert on income inequality and in 1999 published a paper in the Journal of Economic Literature summarizing the main literature on the topic.

Selected bibliography 

 Aghion, Philippe; Caroli, Eve; Garcia-Penalosa, Cecilia (1999). "Inequality and Economic Growth: The Perspective of the New Growth Theories". Journal of Economic Literature. 37 (4): 1615–1660. 
 Eicher, Theo S.; Garcı́a-Peñalosa, Cecilia (2001-10-01). "Inequality and growth: the dual role of human capital in development". Journal of Development Economics. 66 (1): 173–197. 
 García Peñalosa, Cecilia; Turnovsky, Stephen J. (2005-06-01). "Second-best optimal taxation of capital and labor in a developing economy". Journal of Public Economics. 89 (5): 1045–1074.

References

Living people
Year of birth missing (living people)
Alumni of Nuffield College, Oxford
Alumni of Corpus Christi College, Oxford
Alumni of the University of Cambridge
Academic staff of Aix-Marseille University
Spanish economists
Spanish women economists